Sri Lanka is an island close to the southern end of India with a tropical environment. The freshwater fauna is as large as it is common to other regions of the world. There are about two million species of arthropods found in the world, and still it is counting with many new species still being discovered. It is very complicated and difficult to summarize the exact number of species found within a certain region.

Freshwater habitats
Freshwater animals are important to the economy of a country. The animal life in freshwater comprises a great diversity. The organisms ranging from tiny protozoa to large mammals in size. Sri Lanka is a hydraulic civilization. First civilizations in Sri Lanka were originated closer to main rivers in Sri Lanka such as Mahaweli, Kelani, Malwathu and Gin Ganga. Rivers in Sri Lanka flow in a radial pattern, from central hills where there are numerous waterfalls, the rivers flowing to the west, east and south being shorter than thoe flowing to north., north west and north east. Several streams join these rivers. Some of the streams in the hill country and mid country are quick flowing streams known as torrential streams.

Sri Lankan freshwater habitats can be divided into 6 major types - river, stream, lake, pond, villu and paddy field - according to size, depth, rate of flow and type of bottom. Medium-sized rivers are called Oya and fast flowing streams torrential streams are called Dola in Sinhalese. 
The following list provide the freshwater fauna of Sri Lanka.

Adaptations of freshwater fauna
The life history of any animal is divisible into 3 phases, initially a period of slow development, followed by a rapid growth with a voracious appetite and finally to an adult which breeds at regular intervals and continue to grow slowly. Most freshwater animals breed during or after monsoon rains where water is available for the young to spread over a wide area where crowding is less and there is a plentiful supply of food in the form of minute plants and animals.

During dry season, conditions in temporary habitats become less and less favourable for aquatic animals. Those cut off in small habitats are quickly killed off, others in larger habitats survive longer. During this period, food become scarce and water level reduces. Animals become weakened or diseased and die or are eaten by birds and terrestrial animals. Many freshwater animals show adaptations to drought conditions. Fish with air breathing ability, utilize atmospheric oxygen to moisten gills, mud burrowing ability are some of them. Smaller crustaceans, produce eggs with hard resistant covering capable of surviving even a severe drought. These cysts are blown by wind and the species is dispersed. Freshwater crabs and prawns carry their eggs until they hatch out, while leeches carry the young in a pouch.

Researches on Sri Lankan freshwater fauna
Knowledge of Sri Lankan freshwater fauna has been considerably enhanced in the last twenty years or so in two ways. One is through the publication of monographs. The other way is through Swedish Expedition and Smithsonian Institution. Several animals groups were identified extensively from Sri Lanka, such as fish, amphibians, odonates and arthropods. Other freshwater fauna of Sri Lanka need more detailed work, which are currently based on the notes of way back in British period. According to the National Red Data List in 2012, many freshwater habitats are degraded at an alarming rate due to rapid human interference. Habitat destruction, fragmentation and loss of forest cover has increased in past decade rapidly. The result becomes severe, where many amphibians have been not recorded after their discovery, which led the scientists to categorize Sri Lanka as a biodiversity hotspot.

Protozoa

Family: Amoebidae
Phylum: Amoebozoa Class: Tubulinea  Order: Tubulinida 
 Amoeba verrucosa

Family: Actinophryidae
Phylum: Ochrophyta Order: Actinochrysophyceae

 Actinophrys sol

Family: Arcellidae
Phylum: Amoebozoa Class: Tubulinea  Order: Arcellinida 
 Arcella discoides 
 Arcella vulgaris 
 Sphenoderia lenta

Family: Centropyxidae
Phylum: Amoebozoa Class: Tubulinea  Order: Arcellinida 
 Centropyxis aculeata

Family: Ceratiaceae
Phylum: Dinoflagellata Class: Dinophyceae  Order: Gonyaulacales 
 Ceratium hirudinella

Family: Clathrulinidae
Phylum: Cercozoa Class: Granofilosea   Order: Desmothoracida
 Clathrulina elegans

Family: Codonellidae
Phylum: Ciliophora Class: Oligotrichea  Order: Choreotrichida 
 Codonella lacustris
 Tintinnopsis ovalis

Family: Difflugiidae
Phylum: Amoebozoa Class: Tubulinea  Order: Arcellinida 
 Difflugia acuminata 
 Difflugia arcula 
 Difflugia constricta 
 Difflugia corona 
 Difflugia globulosa 
 Difflugia lobostoma 
 Difflugia pyriformis 
 Difflugia urceolata 
 Lesquereusia spiralis

Family: Epistylidae
Phylum: Ciliophora Class: Ciliatea  Order: Sessilida 
 Epistylis anastatica

Family: Euglenaceae
Phylum: Euglenozoa Class: Euglenoidea  Order: Euglenales 
 Euglena sp.

Family: Euglyphidae
Phylum: Cercozoa Class: Imbricatea   Order: Euglyphida
 Euglypha alveolata
 Euglypha ciliata
 Trinema enchelys

Family: Glaucomidae
Phylum: Ciliophora Class: Oligohymenophorea  Order: Tetrahymenida 
 Colpoda cucullus

Family: Hyalospheniidae
Phylum: Amoebozoa Class: Tubulinea  Order: Arcellinida 
 Hyalosphenia elegans 
 Hyalosphenia papilio

Family: Ichthyophthiriidae
Phylum: Ciliophora Class: Oligohymenophorea  Order: Hymenostomatida 
 Ichthyophthirius multifiliis

Family: Oxytrichidae
Phylum: Ciliophora Class: Spirotrichea  
 Oxytricha mystacea
 Stylonychia pustulata

Family: Parameciidae
Phylum: Ciliophora Class: Oligohymenophorea  Order: Peniculida 
 Paramecium sp.

Family: Pelomyxidae
Phylum: Amoebozoa Class: Archamoebae  Order: Pelobiontida 
 Pelomyxa quarta

Family: Peridiniaceae
Phylum: Myzozoa Class: Dinophyceae  Order: Peridiniales 
 Peridinium tabulatum

Family: Trichodinidae
Phylum: Ciliophora Class: Oligohymenophorea  Order: Peritrichida 
 Cyclochaeta domerguei

Family: Volvocaceae
Phylum: Chlorophyta Class: Chlorophyceae  Order: Chlamydomonadales 
 Volvox aureus

Family: Vorticellidae
Phylum: Ciliophora Class: Oligohymenophorea  Order: Sessilida 
 Vorticella sp.

Moss animals
Phylum: Bryozoa Class: Phylactolaemata  Order: Plumatellida

Family: Pectinatellidae
 Pectinatella burmanica

Family: Plumatellidae
 Plumatella emarginata
 Plumatella longigemmis

Hairybacks
Phylum: Gastrotricha  Order: Chaetonotida

Family: Chaetonotidae
 Chaetonotus (Chaetonotus) larus 
 Ichthydium (Ichthydium) podura

Sponges
Phylum: Porifera Class: Demospongiae  Order: Spongillida

Family: Spongillidae
 Eunapius carteri 
 Radiospongilla cerebellata

Cnidarians
Phylum: Cnidaria Class: Hydrozoa  Order: Anthoathecata

Family: Hydridae
 Hydra Vulgaris 
 Hydra zeylandica

Wheel animals
Phylum: Rotifera  

Sri Lankan freshwaters are home for 124 species of wheel animals.

Flatworms
Phylum: Xenacoelomorpha  Order: Acoela

Family: Convolutidae
 Convoluta anotica

Phylum: Platyhelminthes  Order: Rhabdocoela

Family: Scutariellidae
 Caridinicola platei
 Monodiscus macbridei
 Monodiscus parvus

Family: Typhloplanidae
 Mesostoma ehrenbergii
 Strongylostoma radiatum

Phylum: Platyhelminthes  Class: Trematoda  Order: Plagiorchiida

Family: Pleurogenidae
 Pleurogenoides sitapuri

Phylum: Platyhelminthes  Class: Cestoda  Order: Bothriocephalidea

Family: Bothriocephalidae
 Senga lucknowensis

Roundworms
Phylum: Nematoda  Class: Enoplea  Order: Dorylaimida

Family: Dorylaimidae
 Dorylaimus sp.

Class: Chromadorea  Order: Rhabditida

Family: Camallanidae
 Zeylanema anabantis
 Zeylanema fernandoi
 Zeylanema kulasirii
 Zeylanema mastacembeli
 Zeylanema pearsi
 Zeylanema sweeti
 Procammallanus spiculogubernaculus
 Procammallanus planoratus

Gordian worms
Phylum: Nematomorpha  Class: Gordioida  Order: Chordodea

Family: Chordodidae
 Chordodes skorikowi 
 Chordodes verrucosus 
 Paragordius tricuspidatus

Segmented worms
Phylum: Annelida

Family: Aeolosomatidae
 Aeolosoma ternarium

Class: Clitellata  Order: Haplotaxida

Family: Naididae
 Allonais paraguayensis 
 Aulophorus michaelseni 
 Aulophorus tonkinensis 
 Bothrioneurum iris
 Chaetogaster sp. 
 Dero digitata
 Dero zeylanica
 Limnodrilus hoffmeisteri
 Pristina (Pristina) breviseta
 Pristina (Pristina) proboscidea

Family: Almidae
 Glyphidrilus sp.

Order: Rhynchobdellida

Family: Ozobranchidae
 Ozobranchus shipleyi

Family: Galeommatidae
 Hirudinaria manillensis

Family: Glossiphoniidae
 Paraclepsis vulnifera
 Placobdella ceylanica
 Placobdella emydae
 Placobdella undulata
 Limnatus paluda
 Dinobdella ferox

Order: Arhynchobdellida

Family: Hirudinidae
 Hirudo birmanica
 Hirudinaria manillensis

Molluscs
Phylum: Mollusca  Class: Gastropoda  Order: Cycloneritida

Family: Neritidae
 Septaria livesayi 
 Septaria reticulata 
 Septaria squamata
 Theodoxus perotetiana

Order: Caenogastropoda

Family: Pachychilidae
 Faunus ater 
 Melanoides broti 
 Melanoides crenulata
 Melanoides lineata
 Melanoides tuberculata

Family: Thiaridae
 Thiara datura
 Thiara rudia
 Thiara scabra

References

 
Freshwater fauna
Sri Lanka, Freshwater fauna
Freshwater fauna